Aitor Iruarrizaga Amarika (born 29 July 1968), known as Aitor Iru, is a Spanish retired footballer who played as a goalkeeper, and is the goalkeeping coach of Athletic Bilbao.

Playing career

Iru was born in Bilbao in the province of Biscay, in the Basque Country, and began his career with Biscayan club Barakaldo. After two seasons with Barakaldo in Segunda División B, he joined local giants Athletic Bilbao in 1991. He spent two seasons playing for the B team in the Segunda División, but never appeared for the first team, and left to sign for second tier rivals Compostela in 1993. In his first season, Compostela achieved promotion to La Liga for the first time in their history after winning a playoff. He continued to be first choice in 1994–95, making 37 top flight appearances as Compostela avoided relegation. He joined fellow first division club Mérida in the summer of 1995, but made only 4 appearances during his sole season with the club, all in the Copa del Rey.

Mérida were relegated in 1996, and Iru left the club that summer to sign for Almería in the Segunda División. He spent two seasons with Almería, in the first of which they were relegated to Segunda División B. He joined Eibar in 1998, where he played in the second tier for four seasons before signing for Segunda División B side Amurrio in 2002, where he finished his career.

Coaching career

Iru returned to Bilbao Athletic in 2008, becoming their goalkeeping coach, a position he held for one season. He made another return to the club in 2011, this time becoming goalkeeping coach for the first team, replacing Luis Llopis. In July 2017, Cuco Ziganda, who had until then been coaching the B team, replaced Ernesto Valverde as Athletic manager. Ziganda brought Imanol Etxeberria with him as goalkeeping coach so he and Etxeberria swapped places, Iru returning to the B team.

In December 2018, B team coach Gaizka Garitano followed Ziganda's path by being promoted to first team manager, replacing Eduardo Berizzo. Like Ziganda, he chose to bring his goalkeeping coach with him, meaning Iru was promoted to the first team once again, replacing Carlos Kisluk. As of March 2021, Iru remains in post, now working under Marcelino, who replaced Garitano in January of that year.

Personal life

Iru's son Ander is also a goalkeeper, who has played for Bilbao Athletic since 2016. Ander was coached by his father during the latter's tenure as Bilbao Athletic goalkeeping coach in 2017–18. Aitor's brother , older by almost six years, was also a goalkeeper, representing both Athletic Bilbao and Osasuna in La Liga. Patxi's son Jon is a midfielder, currently playing for Haro Deportivo in Segunda División B.

Career statistics

1. Appearances in the 1993–94 Segunda División promotion playoff

References

External links

Aitor Iruarrizaga at Athletic Club Website Oficial

1968 births
Living people
Spanish footballers
Footballers from Bilbao
Association football goalkeepers
La Liga players
Segunda División players
Segunda División B players
Barakaldo CF footballers
Bilbao Athletic footballers
SD Compostela footballers
CP Mérida footballers
UD Almería players
SD Eibar footballers
Association football coaches
Athletic Bilbao non-playing staff